YII may refer to:
 Factor XII, a plasma protein 
 Yii, a web application framework
 yii, ISO 639-3 code of the Yidiny language
 Young Inventors International